Welzow (Lower Sorbian Wjelcej) is a town in the district of Spree-Neiße, in southeastern Brandenburg, Germany. It is situated 16 km northwest of Hoyerswerda, and 23 km southwest of Cottbus.

Demography

References

Populated places in Spree-Neiße